Rhododendron minus, the Piedmont rhododendron, is a rhododendron species native to Tennessee, North Carolina, South Carolina, Georgia, and Alabama.  It has two subspecies: Rhododendron minus var. chapmanii and Rhododendron minus var. minus (the latter also known as Rhododendron carolinianum).

References

Bibliography 
 Fl. Bor.-Amer. 1: 258 1803.
 The Plant List: Rhododendron minus
 ITIS
 Hirsutum.com
 USDA PLANTS Profile
 North Carolina State University: Rhododendron minus

minus
Flora of the Southeastern United States
Plants described in 1792